Cinli Boluslu (also, Cinli Bo-luslu, Dzhinli-Boluslu, and Dzhinly-Boluslu) is a village and municipality in the Goranboy Rayon of Azerbaijan.  It has a population of 1,313.

References 

Populated places in Goranboy District